Laubuka ruhuna is a cyprinid fish species in the family Cyprinidae, which is endemic to island Sri Lanka.

Etymology
The specific name "ruhuna" is from Sinhala language meaning "south of the island" of Sri Lanka, confirming that the presence of this freshwater fish to southern parts of the country.

References

Laubuka
Fish of Asia
Taxa named by Rohan Pethiyagoda
Taxa named by Maurice Kottelat
Taxa named by Anjana Silva
Taxa named by Kalana Maduwage
Taxa named by Madhava Meegaskumbura
Fish described in 2008